Parasuchidae is a clade of phytosaurs more derived than Diandongosuchus, a basal phytosaur. It encompasses nearly all phytosaurs, include early Parasuchus-grade forms as well as a more restricted clade of more specialized phytosaurs. This more restricted clade is traditionally known as the family Phytosauridae and more recently as the subfamily Mystriosuchinae.

Parasuchids have been recovered from Late Triassic deposits in Europe, North America, India, Morocco, Thailand, Brazil, Greenland and Madagascar. In their osteology of Parasuchus, Kammerer et al. (2016) suggested using Parasuchidae to include taxa traditionally included in Phytosauridae as well as Parasuchus-grade taxa. Stocker et al. (2017) use the phytosaur classification advocated by Kammerer et al. (2016) by recovering Diandongosuchus as the basalmost phytosaur outside Parasuchidae, noting that Diandongosuchus has a shorter snout than parasuchids.

References

Phytosaurs
Prehistoric reptile families
Late Triassic reptiles
Carnian first appearances
Rhaetian extinctions
Taxa named by Richard Lydekker